Indulin may refer to:
 Induline, a series of dyestuffs of blue, bluish-red or black shades
 a trade name for products such as Indulin AA-86, a proprietary fatty amine derivative used as an asphalt emulsifier